Avasarala Kanyakumari is a violinist from South India who specializes in Carnatic music.

Career

Kanyakumari is a native of Vijayanagaram, Andhra Pradesh and has lived in Chennai for more than five decades.

Awards and honours
A Kanyakumari was awarded the Sangeetha Kalanidhi award of the Madras Music Academy for the year 2016. She is the first female violinist to get the award.
Other awards include
Padma Shri by Government of India (2015)
Sangita Kalanidhi from the Music Academy, Chennai (2016)
Kalaimamani from Govt. of Tamil Nadu
Ugadi Puraskar from Govt. of Andhra Pradesh
Top Rank by A.I.R
Honorary citizenship of the state of Maryland, U.S
TTK Award from the Music Academy, Chennai
Asthana Viidushi of Sringeri Sarada Peetam, Ahobila Mutt and Avadhoota Peetam
"Saptagiri sangeetha vidwanmani from Sri Tyagaraja Festival Committee of Tirupathi.
Dhanurveena Praveena, a title bestowed on her by  M.S. Subbulakshmi, commemorating Kanyakumari's 25 years in concerts
Sangeeta Kala Nipuna, from the Mylapore Fine Arts Club, 2002 
Sangeet Natak Akademi Award, 2003
 Sangeetha Chudamani Award from Krishna Gana Sabha, 2012
She was selected for Limca Book of Records 2004 for her various achievements in music as a versatile woman violinist.

References

Carnatic violinists
Recipients of the Sangeet Natak Akademi Award
Living people
Recipients of the Padma Shri in arts
People from Tamil Nadu
People from Vizianagaram
21st-century violinists
Year of birth missing (living people)